Miccolamia yakushimensis is a species of beetle in the family Cerambycidae. It was described by Hasegawa and N. Ohbayashi in 2001. It is known from Japan.

References

Desmiphorini
Beetles described in 2001